The following lists events that happened during 1955 in Chile.

Incumbents
President of Chile: Carlos Ibáñez del Campo

Events

February
18 February - In Antarctica, the Chilean Aguirre Cerda Research Station is inaugurated on Deception Island.
27 February - The 1955 South American Championship begins.

March
30 March - The 1955 South American Championship ends. The first place was obtained by Argentina and the second place, Chile.

April
7 April - The O'Higgins Sports Club is founded in the city of Rancagua.

June
12 June - closes the evening newspaper Los Tiempos.

July
17 July – San Bernardo train crash

October
1 October – Finance minister Abraham Perez resigns due to disagreements with President Campo.

November
19 November - The Deportes Linares soccer team is founded in the city of Linares.

Births
13 January – Eduardo Bonvallet (d. 2015)
27 February – Belus Prajoux
20 April – René Valenzuela
23 April – Juan Giha
15 June – Iván Flores
21 June – Juan Carlos Orellana
10 August – Gustavo Moscoso
5 November – Oscar Wirth
19 December – Alfredo Castro (actor)

Deaths
13 October – Alberto Cabero (b. 1874)
19 October – Carlos Dávila (b. 1887)
27 October – Tulio Manuel Cestero (b. 1877)

References 

 
Years of the 20th century in Chile
Chile